Jean-Louis Prianon (born February 22, 1960 in Saint-Joseph, Réunion) is a retired long-distance runner from France, who represented his native country in the men's 10,000 metres at the 1988 Summer Olympics, finishing in fourth place.

Achievements

References
 1988 Year Ranking

1960 births
Living people
French male long-distance runners
Athletes (track and field) at the 1988 Summer Olympics
Olympic athletes of France